D'amore di morte e di altre sciocchezze is a 1996 studio album by Italian singer-songwriter Francesco Guccini.

Track listing
 "Lettera"
 "Vorrei"
 "Quattro stracci"
 "Stelle"
 "Canzone delle colombe e del fiore"
 "Il caduto"
 "Cirano"
 "Il matto"
 "I fichi"

Francesco Guccini albums
1990 albums